Andrii Sybiha (born 1 January 1975) is a Ukrainian statesman, diplomat, jurist, and the Deputy Head of the Office of the President of Ukraine.

Early life 

Andrii Sybiha was born in Zboriv, Ternopil Oblast. In 1997, he graduated from University of Lviv, as a specialist in international relations. He is fluent in English and Polish.

Career 

In 1997—1998, he was an attache, third, second secretary of the department of state and legal issues of the Contract and Legal Department of Ministry of Foreign Affairs of Ukraine.

In 1998—2002, he was the second and first secretary of the Embassy of Ukraine in the Republic of Poland.

In 2002—2003, he was the first secretary of the legal and humanitarian cooperation department of the European Integration Office of Ministry of Foreign Affairs of Ukraine.

In 2003—2005, he was the head of the international legal cooperation department of the Contract and Legal Department of MFA Ukraine.

In 2005—2006, he was the head of the Department of International Law and Legislation in the Field of Foreign Policy of the Contract Law Department of MFA of Ukraine.

In 2006—2008, he was the deputy director of the Contractual and Legal Department of MFA of Ukraine.

In 2008—2012, he was an adviser-envoy of the Embassy of Ukraine in the Republic of Poland.

In 2012—2016, he was the director of the Consular Service Department of MFA of Ukraine.

On August 23, 2016, he was appointed Ambassador Extraordinary and Plenipotentiary of Ukraine to the Republic of Turkey. On May 19, 2021, he was dismissed from his post by the decree of President Volodymyr Zelenskyy.

Since May 31, 2021, he is the Deputy Head of the Office of the President of Ukraine.

Awards 

Order of Merit, Third Class (August 21, 2020) — for a significant personal contribution to state building, socio-economic, scientific-technical, cultural-educational development of Ukraine, significant labor achievements and high professionalism
Order of Merit, Second Class (December 22, 2021) — for significant personal contribution to strengthening international cooperation of Ukraine, many years of fruitful diplomatic activity and high professionalism

References 

Living people
1975 births
People from Zboriv
University of Lviv alumni
Ambassadors of Ukraine to Turkey
Recipients of the Order of Merit (Ukraine), 3rd class
Recipients of the Order of Merit (Ukraine), 2nd class
21st-century Ukrainian politicians